The 2022 season for  is the sixth season in the team's existence, all of which have been as a UCI WorldTeam, and the second under the current name. They use Merida bicycles, Shimano drivetrain, Vision wheels and Alé clothing.

Team roster 

Riders who joined the team for the 2022 season

Riders who left the team during or after the 2021 season

Season victories

National, Continental, and World Champions

Notes

References

External links 

 

Team Bahrain Victorious
2022
Team Bahrain Victorious